United Nations Security Council Resolution 362 was adopted by the U.N. on October 23, 1974. The Security Council decided that, although the Middle East remained quiet, the situation was still volatile, and therefore this Security Council resolution extended the mandate of the United Nations Emergency Force for another six months, until April 24, 1975.  The Council commended the Force and those governments supplying men to it for their contributions and expressed its confidence that the Force would be maintained with maximum efficiency and economy.  The Resolution also reaffirmed that the Force must be able to function militarily in the whole Egypt-Israel sector of operations without differentiation regarding the UN status of the various contingents.

The resolution passed with 13 votes to none, while China and Iraq did not participate in voting.

See also
 Arab–Israeli conflict
 Egypt–Israel relations
 List of United Nations Security Council Resolutions 301 to 400 (1971–1976)
 Yom Kippur War

References
Text of the Resolution at undocs.org

External links
 

 0362
Arab–Israeli peace process
Yom Kippur War
October 1974 events